The Democratic Organization of Iranian Women (DAW) is women's wing of the Tudeh Party of Iran.

Led by Maryam Firouz, it was founded in 1943 as the 'Organization of Iranian Women' (OIW) and joined Women's International Democratic Federation in 1947.

The organization "demanded radical transformations in the laws governing the rights of women in the family and at the workplace", according to Hammed Shahidian. They published a monthly magazine named Bidari-e Ma, edited by Zahra Eskandari-Bayat.

OIW was banned in 1949, along with Tudeh itself and other affiliates, but the party managed to revive it in 1951 with another name: 'Democratic Organization of Iranian Women'.

References

External links 
 Official website

Women's wings of communist parties
Iranian women's political groups
Organizations established in 1943
1943 establishments in Iran
Affiliated organizations of the Tudeh Party of Iran
Feminism in Iran